State Route 275 (SR 275) is a  southwest–northeast state highway entirely within Effingham County in southeast Georgia. It travels from a point between Rincon and Springfield to Ebenezer.

Route description

SR 275 begins at an intersection with SR 21 between Rincon and Springfield. It travels to the northeast to its eastern terminus, at a dead end in the ghost town of Ebenezer on the Savannah River.

Major intersections

See also

References

External links

 State Route 275 on State-Ends.com

Transportation in Effingham County, Georgia
275